The 2022 Liga 3 Banten is the fifth edition of Liga 3 Banten organized by Asprov PSSI Banten.

Followed by 21 clubs. The winner of this competition will immediately advance to the national round.

Persikota is the defending champion after winning it in the 2021 season.

Teams

Venues 
Krakatau Steel Stadium, Cilegon
Maulana Yusuf Stadium, Serang

First round

Group A

Group B

Group C

Group D

Knockout round

Bracket

Quarter-finals

Semi-finals

Note: Penalty shootout has reached the last kicker but the result is still a draw. Then the referee draws lots to determine the winner of the match. As a result, Persikota was declared the winner.

Third place play-off

Final

References 

Liga 3
Liga 3 (Indonesia) seasons
Sport in Banten